The Homeland Security Appropriations Act of 2004 was a United States Act of Congress that gave the authority for the President to fund the operations of the Department of Homeland Security for each fiscal year.

History
June 2003
The first Act was passed in June 2003 and authorized US$29.4 billion for Homeland Security.

October 2003

President George W. Bush signed the 2004 Act on October 1, 2003.

October 2004

The Act 2004 (PL 108-90) consisted of US $31 billion to be spent on:

 $5.6 billion for Project BioShield - to be used by the Department of Health and Human Services to finds ways to protect Americans (i.e., vaccines and treatments) from biological, or chemical, or radiological threats
 $4 billion of grants to create "first responders" as the first line of defense against threats to the United States; $40 million towards Citizen Corps Councils and other funds to the United States Coast Guard towards the Container Security Initiative
 $900 million in this bill will go to science and technology projects

See also
 United States Department of Homeland Security
 Homeland Security Act

External links
 HSAA 2004
 Pryce: America Safer Today than Two Years Ago

United States federal defense and national security legislation
Appripriations Act
Acts of the 108th United States Congress
United States federal appropriations legislation